Richard Michael Lord (born August 25, 1954 in Inglewood, California) is an American film actor, producer, director, gaffer and author. He is perhaps most known for being a co-founder of Matchlight Films along with brothers Phillip Wade and Tim Wade. He is author of the book 
"A Gaffer's Perspective on Independent Filmmaking".

Filmography

Film

References

External links 
 

1954 births
21st-century American male actors
Film producers from California
Living people
People from Inglewood, California